SS Midnight may refer to one of two Type C2-S-AJ1 ships built by North Carolina Shipbuilding for the United States Maritime Commission during World War II:

 , launched 14 April 1944; transferred to the United States Navy as  USS Wrangell (AE-12); scrapped in 1983

See also
 Midnight (disambiguation)#Ships for other ships

Ship names